Gary Thomas DiSarcina (born November 19, 1967) is an American former professional baseball shortstop and third base coach for the Washington Nationals of Major League Baseball (MLB). He played his entire career for the California / Anaheim Angels.

Shortstop for Angels (1992–98)

In 1987, he played collegiate summer baseball with the Harwich Mariners of the Cape Cod Baseball League. He was drafted by the California Angels in the sixth round of the 1988 Major League Baseball draft.

He missed six weeks of action during that season, from August 4 through September 18, after sustaining a torn ligament in his thumb.

In , his finest all-around season, he was voted the Angels' team MVP. That year, in 157 games played, DiSarcina reached career highs in hits (158) and runs batted in (56), while batting .287. But it was his last full season as a player; his career, hampered by injuries — including a broken arm that cost him half of the  season — wound down during the next two years.

All told, DiSarcina played in 1,086 Major League games, all with the Angels; his 966 hits included 186 doubles, 20 triples and 28 home runs.

DiSarcina wore several numbers over the course of his career.  He wore the number 4 during his first season.  He changed to number 11, then to number 33 (in tribute to Larry Bird), and finally to number 9 for his remaining four seasons.

A DiSarcina fly ball was caught by Texas Ranger Rusty Greer for the final out of Kenny Rogers' perfect game on July 28, 1994.

Minor league manager, MLB executive
After DiSarcina's playing career ended, he was associated with the Red Sox for several seasons, as baseball operations consultant to the team's front office, an in-studio analyst for the New England Sports Network, minor league manager and instructor. He skippered the Lowell Spinners of the Short Season-A New York–Penn League for three above-.500 seasons (2007–09) and served as the Red Sox' minor league infield instruction coordinator in 2010. DiSarcina was also the third base coach for Italy in the 2006 World Baseball Classic.

In 2011–12, he returned to the Angels as an assistant to general managers Tony Reagins and Jerry Dipoto, and also held the post of field coordinator of player instruction in the club's farm system.

He then came back to the Red Sox organization for one season —  — as manager of the Pawtucket Red Sox, Boston's  Triple-A minor league affiliate. During 2013, he led the PawSox to a first-place finish in the IL North Division with an 80–63 record and into the finals of the Governors' Cup championship, before his club fell to the Durham Bulls.  For his efforts, he was selected 2013 Minor League Manager of the Year by Baseball America. DiSarcina's four-year managerial record through 2013 is 205–162 (.559).

Coaching career

DiSarcina's success at Pawtucket earned him a Major League managerial interview for the opening with the Seattle Mariners (who would hire Lloyd McClendon).  On November 5, 2013, he joined the 2014 staff of Angels' manager Mike Scioscia, taking over the third-base coach's job from Dino Ebel, promoted to bench coach. After two seasons at third base, DiSarcina was shifted across the diamond to coach first base when Ron Roenicke rejoined Scioscia's staff for  after a five-year absence.

On November 11, 2016, the Red Sox announced that DiSarcina would return to the Boston organization for a third time, as the 2017 bench coach on the MLB staff of manager John Farrell. In that role, he succeeded Torey Lovullo, who departed on November 4 to become manager of the Arizona Diamondbacks. DiSarcina served one season in that post, until Farrell's firing two days after Boston fell in the American League Division Series. On November 5, 2017, DiSarcina took over as the 2018 bench coach of the New York Mets on the staff of new manager Mickey Callaway. After one year as bench coach, he was reassigned to become the Mets' 2019 third-base coach.

On November 2, 2021, the Washington Nationals hired DiSarcina to be their 3rd base coach for the 2022 season.

See also
List of Major League Baseball players who spent their entire career with one franchise

References

External links

1967 births
Living people
American expatriate baseball players in Canada
American League All-Stars
Anaheim Angels players
Baseball coaches from Massachusetts
Baseball players from Massachusetts
Bend Bucks players
Boston Red Sox coaches
California Angels players
Edmonton Trappers players
Erie SeaWolves players
Harwich Mariners players
Lake Elsinore Storm players
Los Angeles Angels coaches
Los Angeles Angels of Anaheim coaches
Los Angeles Angels of Anaheim executives
Lowell Spinners managers
Major League Baseball bench coaches
Major League Baseball first base coaches
Major League Baseball shortstops
Major League Baseball third base coaches
Midland Angels players
New York Mets coaches
Pawtucket Red Sox managers
Pawtucket Red Sox players
People from Billerica, Massachusetts
Sportspeople from Middlesex County, Massachusetts
Sportspeople from Malden, Massachusetts
UMass Minutemen baseball players
University of Massachusetts Amherst alumni